The 1985 United States–Canada tornado outbreak, referred to as the Barrie tornado outbreak in Canada, was a major tornado outbreak that occurred in Ohio, Pennsylvania, New York, and Ontario, on May 31, 1985. In all 44 tornadoes were counted including 14 in Ontario, Canada. It is the largest and most intense tornado outbreak ever to hit this region,  and the worst tornado outbreak in Pennsylvania history in terms of deaths and destruction.

Meteorological synopsis

The upper air pattern was conducive for a major severe weather event in the Great Lakes that Friday, May 31. An unseasonably deep low pressure system at 984 hPa crossed out of the Midwestern U.S. through the day, and then into the Upper Peninsula of Michigan. Very warm air surged in ahead of this system. Temperatures reached the upper twenties in Celsius (approximately 80–85 Fahrenheit) across much of southern Ontario, in addition to high dew point levels. An unstable atmosphere (surface based lifted indices around minus 6) was the byproduct of this. Directional wind shear was also present in the warm sector of the storm, in addition to high helicity values and a vorticity maximum approaching the lower lakes.

The situation was worsened by the presence of copious amounts of moisture, which would allow any storms that could form to become severe rather quickly. Also, this was supportive of the HP (high-precipitation) counterpart of the supercell thunderstorm (Verkaik, 1997). All of this added up to the distinct possibility of severe rotating storms that were messy, hard to see, and extremely dangerous. What was needed now was a trigger, and that came in the form of a trailing cold front behind the low. Severe thunderstorms and isolated tornadoes had already raked parts of the Midwest U.S. (particularly in Iowa and Wisconsin) the day before on May 30, associated with this same cold front (Grazulis, 1990).

The day started off on an active note with the warm front moving northwards. A possible tornado was reported near Leamington, accompanied by golfball size hail from widespread severe thunderstorm activity in southwestern Ontario. Following the warm frontal passage, skies cleared rapidly and temperatures quickly began to rise. The cold front began crossing Lake Huron towards the noon hour, and with it several thunderstorms developed shortly after 1:30pm EDT, with the northernmost cell soon becoming most dominant. Environment Canada issued a severe thunderstorm warning at 2:25pm for Bruce County (complementing the special weather statement issued early that morning). At around 2:50pm, an F2 tornado touched down briefly in the Lion's Head area (north of Wiarton) before moving out over Georgian Bay and dissipating.

At daybreak on May 31, 1985, a strong area of low pressure was centered near Duluth, Minnesota. A cold front extended south from the low across the western Great Lakes and then through Illinois and Missouri. The low tracked across the northern Great Lakes during the afternoon, while the cold front progressed eastward across Indiana and western Ohio. By late afternoon, temperatures had reached 87 degrees at Cleveland, 82 degrees at Youngstown, and 85 degrees at Erie, Pennsylvania. At the same time, conditions in the upper atmosphere continued to become more favorable for an outbreak of severe weather. By early afternoon, thunderstorms developed in Ontario, Canada just ahead of the cold front.

Despite a forecast for severe thunderstorms, though, the sun shone relentlessly for most of that Friday because of a fourth element: a stable air mass at about 2,000 feet, which served as a "lid" on the brew beneath. Then, at 2:50 p.m., the "lid" moved, and huge cumulonimbus clouds—anvil-topped thunderheads—seemingly appeared out of nowhere all along the Ohio-Pennsylvania border. The storms quickly grew into powerful tornadic supercells.

Storm timeline and aftermath
The outbreak lasted roughly from just before 2 p.m. EDT, when the first tornado touched down in Wiarton, Ontario, until just after 12 a.m. EDT when the last reported tornado struck Tobyhanna, Pennsylvania. The peak of the outbreak took place during the early evening hours where the strongest and deadliest tornadoes formed across western Pennsylvania and eastern Ohio.

The first of two F4 tornadoes to affect Erie County touched down just west of the Pennsylvania state line around 5 p.m. The tornado moved across the northwestern tip of Crawford County and then entered Erie County near Pennside. After causing considerable damage there, the tornado slammed into Albion leveling the town. A ten-block area was completely destroyed, with nine people being killed. The tornado killed three more people in Cranesville before lifting. There were also 82 injuries, and a total of 309 destroyed buildings. The second F4 to affect Erie County touched down between Wattsburg and Corry in eastern Erie County. It clipped the northwestern tip of Warren County, before crossing into New York, where it did some damage in Chautauqua County, before dissipating near Panama.

The most famous tornado of this outbreak touched down in Portage County, Ohio, near the Ravenna National Guard Armory at about 6:30 p.m. and cut a  path through Newton Falls, Niles, and Hubbard, Ohio, before entering Pennsylvania. This was the only F5 in the United States in 1985, and the deadliest Ohio tornado since the Xenia F5 during the 1974 Super Outbreak.

90 people were killed in the United States and Canada in the outbreak; the most for an outbreak since the 1974 Super Outbreak, and a mark that stood until the 2011 Super Outbreak. It was the third costliest tornado outbreak in the history of the U.S., where it caused $600 million (2010 U.S. dollars) damage in Ohio, Pennsylvania, and New York. It was also one of the costliest in Canada: damage in Ontario totaled an estimated $400 million USD. The damage would total nearly $1 billion in 2010 U.S. dollars.

United States

Niles, Ohio/Wheatland, Pennsylvania

This extremely violent tornado began in eastern Ohio, and tore directly through the towns of Niles, Ohio and Wheatland, Pennsylvania, producing F5 damage at both locations. The tornado killed 18 people and injured 310, and was the most violent and deadly of the 44 recorded that day. Registering F5 on the Fujita scale, it remains the only F5 in Pennsylvania history, and was also the most violent tornado reported in the United States in 1985.

It first touched down in Ohio near the Ravenna Arsenal in Portage County around 6:30 PM EDT. Gathering strength, it moved quickly into Newton Falls in Trumbull County causing F3 to F4 damage through much of the town. While nearly 400 homes were heavily damaged or destroyed, no fatalities were recorded in Newton Falls, due to storm preparedness of local authorities and its tornado siren. Additional homes were completely destroyed as the tornado struck the north side of Lordstown. Continuing east, the tornado reached F5 intensity as it tore through the north side of Niles. Hundreds of homes in the Niles area were destroyed, including several homes with anchor bolts that were swept away with the debris scattered downwind. The Niles Park Plaza shopping center was completely leveled and partially swept away at F5 intensity, with several of the fatalities occurring at that location. Steel girders were buckled at the shopping center, and a nearby retirement home and a skating rink were leveled as well. As the tornado struck an industrial area in Niles, large 30 foot tall metal petroleum storage tanks (each weighing 75,000 pounds) were torn from where they were anchored and thrown, some of which were tossed or bounced considerable distances. One of the tanks was found in the middle of a road, 60 yards from where it originated. The tornado weakened slightly as it tore through the north side of Hubbard and through the center of Coalburg, though many additional homes were still leveled in those areas.

As the tornado crossed the state line and reached Wheatland, Pennsylvania, it was a half-mile (0.8 km) wide and had regained F5 strength. A steel-frame trucking plant in Wheatland was obliterated and partially swept away at F5 intensity, as the building's steel girder frame was mangled into a pile and pushed off of the foundation. At nearby Wheatland Sheet and Tube, sections of pavement were scoured from the parking lot, and shards of sheet metal and routing slips were left wedged beneath the remaining asphalt. Ninety-five percent of Wheatland's business and residential area were destroyed. According to Storm Data from the National Weather Service, the destruction of the town "resembled that of a bombed-out battle field." Continuing east, the tornado weakened slightly but remained violent as it struck Hermitage, damaging or destroying 71 homes along with the town's airport, destroying several hangars and planes. A wing from one of the planes was found 10 miles away in Mercer. Another trucking steel processing plant was heavily damaged in Hermitage as well. The tornado then destroyed 15 homes and damaged 30 others in the Greenfield area before finally dissipating.

In Ohio, it was the deadliest tornado since the Xenia F5 during the Super Outbreak of April 3, 1974. The tornado was also captured on camera by several residents. may311985tornadoes.com

Other U.S. tornadoes
Described as "one of the most impressive tornadic events of the 20th century" by meteorologist and researcher Thomas Grazulis, a massive, high-end F4 tornado tracked for 69 miles (110 kilometers) through dense forest in central Pennsylvania. Near the beginning of its path, a few homes were heavily damaged and some outbuildings were destroyed, but otherwise, the tornado passed entirely through uninhabited areas in the Moshannon and Sproul State Forests.  Surveyors estimated the damage path to be at least two and a half miles wide, with more than 90,000 trees obliterated.  The tornado also generated tremors that set off local seismometers, and even the primitive WSR-57 weather radar in State College picked up a distinct reflectivity spike (also known as a "debris ball"), due to the large amount of trees and other vegetation being uprooted and lifted into the air as the tornado passed through the forest north of Interstate 80.

The second-deadliest tornado in Pennsylvania history touched down in Trumbull County, Ohio, just yards away from the Pennsylvania state line, and tracked for 56 miles through northwestern Pennsylvania. Rated F4, the tornado struck Jamestown in northwestern Mercer County, Atlantic and Cochranton in southern Crawford County, and Cooperstown in northern Venango County, narrowly missing Oil City to the north before dissipating south of Tionesta in western Forest County.

One deadly tornado impacted the Pittsburgh metropolitan area. Rated F3, the tornado tracked for 39 miles through northern Beaver County and southern Butler County in southwestern Pennsylvania, approximately 20 miles north of Pittsburgh, narrowly missing the northernmost suburbs of the city. In Big Beaver, two people were killed when the Big Beaver Plaza was destroyed, along with more than 100 vehicles in the parking lot. Across the Beaver River from the shopping plaza, 16 antique vehicles were destroyed in a garage on River Road. Despite being rebuilt in 1987, business never recovered at the shopping plaza, which sits vacant today. In North Sewickley Township, the tornado struck the junction of PA 65 and PA 588, destroying the Spotlight 88 Drive-In Theater, a gas station, three homes and two other businesses. The drive-in theater was never rebuilt, and the site is used as Spotlight 88 Flea Market today. In Butler County, the tornado crossed Interstate 79, where it blew a southbound van a quarter of a mile off the highway. The family inside the van was ejected, but survived. A trailer park near Evans City was destroyed, as was another trailer on Water Station Road, where two people were killed. Near Callery, 40 homes were destroyed. People in the area reported pieces of sheet metal and shreds of pink insulation falling from the sky shortly before the tornado arrived. Near the end of its path, the tornado killed a babysitter and a young girl near Saxonburg, before dissipating near Sarver. In all, this tornado killed nine people, injured 120, and caused more than $10,000,000 of damage in Beaver County.

Three tornadoes were reported in New York: two in Chautauqua County, and one in St. Lawrence County. The first tornado, rated F4, crossed into New York from Erie County, Pennsylvania, and tracked for 28 miles (16 in Pennsylvania, 12 in New York), striking Clymer and Harmony in southwestern Chautauqua County before dissipating. The second tornado, rated F3, touched down in southeastern Chautauqua County and tracked for 13 miles, striking Kiantone, Carroll and Poland, and narrowly missing Jamestown to the east. The third tornado, rated F1, touched down in northern St. Lawrence County, and was produced by a supercell that crossed into the North Country from Ontario. This tornado tracked for five miles, passing north of Norfolk.

In all, 65 people were killed in Pennsylvania, which remains the highest death toll in a tornado outbreak in Pennsylvania history.

Canada 
Most of the tornadic activity at this point moved into southern Ontario producing more tornadoes (some of which were significant). These tornadoes formed around the Highway 7 corridor between Lindsay to Madoc (Joe and Leduc, 1993) near the towns of Wagner Lake (F1 at 5:40pm), Reaboro (F1 at 6:05pm), Ida (F2 at 6:20pm), Rice Lake (F3 at 6:25pm), and Minto (F1 at 6:35pm).  Most of these tornadoes had conversely shorter paths than the earlier tornadoes, likely as a result of the parent thunderstorms beginning to weaken. In addition, they did not receive as much media attention as the previous tornadoes (those earlier storms were grouped collectively by the media as comprising "The Barrie Tornado"), probably a result of the fact that they didn't have the opportunity to cause as much damage.

Even so, at the time these more eastern tornadoes were touching down, a final, more isolated supercell developed near Milverton in eastern Perth County which spawned a tornado at 6:15pm. On the ground for approximately fifteen minutes, this tornado tracked a  path of sporadic F3 damage (mainly to outbuildings) from Alma east-northeast towards the Hillsburgh area.  Its path was almost parallel to the Grand Valley/Tottenham tornado only a couple of hours earlier.

The Hopeville to Barrie supercell

At about the same time the Lion's Head tornado dissipated, two very severe thunderstorms had developed (that likely owed their inception, at least partially, to lake breeze convergence): one to the east of Clinton and another farther to the north, in the Walkerton area. These two developing supercells would grow into a pair of devastating storms within the next hour—likely the most prolific tornado producers in Canadian history to date.

The second tornado of the day touched down south of Hopeville around 3:45pm, causing some localized F3 damage along its track. This tornado lifted after a  path, but another tornado quickly formed just north of Corbetton, in northern Dufferin County, at about 4:15pm. It stayed over rural areas for most of its  path, however a few homes (especially in the Terra Nova and Mansfield area) sustained F3 damage. It has been disputed whether this path was of two separate tornadoes or just one. Shortly after this tornado dissipated, there were hints of another brief touchdown near Angus in the Blackdown Park training area of Canadian Forces Base Borden (north of Alliston). The next tornado was the last of this storm, but was the most infamous one.

At approximately 4:00pm, all electrical power in Barrie went out, as the Grand Valley/Tottenham tornado took out the main hydro transformers, southwest of the city (LeGrand, 1990). Few residents were aware of the tornado, but many people were let off work 30–45 minutes before the storm hit due to these power outages. Had this not happened, the death toll would have been higher. The intensifying tornado first obliterated a pine tree forest plantation. It then entered the southern part of Barrie shortly before 5:00pm. Visibility was very low as the tornado was cloaked in heavy rain and dust. Extensive F3 and localized F4 damage occurred to an entire square block of homes in the Crawford Street and Patterson Road subdivision. Five people were killed in the area as some homes there were not well-built, and thus collapsed after being pushed off their foundations. Most of the fatalities occurred in homes with no basements, where head and chest trauma resulted from an increased exposure to flying debris.

Next, the tornado hit an industrial complex (known then as Molson Park). One person died at a tire retreading facility while at least fifteen other businesses were damaged or destroyed (Bruineman, 2010). Steel I-beams were twisted out of shape, and splinters of wood were found embedded into nearby concrete walls. The tornado then proceeded to cross Highway 400 at Essa Road (former Highway 27) interchange, just missing the Barrie Racetrack to the south. The grandstand was heavily damaged and several barns nearby were destroyed. A man was killed after he was sucked out of his parked car in an adjacent lot (Bruineman, 2010). Several vehicles traveling on Highway 400 were tossed into the ditch, their drivers escaping with only minor injuries. Highway guard rails were found wrapped around telephone poles nearby. Many cars were also found with puncture holes in their frames, owing to the flying debris. As the tornado crossed the highway, it moved into the Allandale subdivision.

Many homes sustained severe damage there, with much of their upper floors missing. The track moved from Debra Crescent to Joanne Court with more extensive damage. Near Tower Crescent, the path narrowed to a comparatively small . On Briar Road, homes sustained only minor damage, indicating that the tornado had weakened, but the next road east, Trillium Crescent, sustained heavy damage indicating that it had strengthened once again. Four warehouses near Highway 11 were ripped apart. It then hit the Tollendal Woods and Minets Point area, taking out the Brentwood Marina and a nearby subdivision. A boy was killed in this area while trying to bicycle home (Bruineman, 2010). More than thirty boats, accompanied by their concrete moorings, were tossed into Lake Simcoe and never to be recovered. The tornado then moved out over Kempenfelt Bay where it became a waterspout for a brief time before weakening out completely. It came very close to the opposite shore, but no damage was reported there. Large quantities of debris from the city were later found floating in the bay, however. Despite the tornado's relatively short path length (under ), eight people died in Barrie with 155 injured, and as many as 300 homes were damaged or destroyed.

The Grand Valley to Tottenham supercell

The storm which had initially developed east of Clinton produced a new tornado a couple kilometres north of Arthur by 4:15pm. Many power lines and hydro towers were destroyed early in its lifetime (including those used to deliver electricity from the Bruce Nuclear Generating Station to northern and western parts of the Greater Toronto Area). The tornado quickly widened, intensified and reached violent proportions by the time it reached the small crossroads community of Grand Valley just before 4:30pm.

The tornado caused major damage in the small town, where two people were killed. An elderly woman visiting from Scotland died as the home was destroyed, and a man was killed in his pickup truck on a nearby farm (Bruineman, 2010). The worst damage was found along Amaranth Street (running west to east, parallel to the tornado's path) where the local library, three churches, and many other homes were severely damaged or destroyed. Approximately sixty structures in total sustained damage. The most severe was on the north side of the street, where some homes exhibited classic F4 damage. The library roof was found some 200 metres away on a nearby house (Bruineman, 2010).

Continuing eastward through more open country, it brushed the northern outskirts of Orangeville about fifteen minutes later (Grazulis, 2001) where the southern portion of the Mono Shopping Plaza completely collapsed (injuring 67 people, one of them seriously). Two more people died here, as an elderly man was crushed under an equipment shed on his farm and a woman was killed in her home (Bruineman, 2010). The tornado continued moving to the east-northeast, crossing Highway 400 into York region. When the earliest tornado track maps were published within the next year, they showed this particular tornado to have tracked almost twice as far towards the Peterborough area before dissipating. In more recent years this theory has proved to be incorrect; it is likely that this supercell was also a cyclic one.

Aftermath
Following the event, ninety people were dead and 281 were injured, as close to a thousand businesses and homes were wiped out (Grazulis, 2001). Still, hundreds more were left out of work largely as a result of the massive damage sustained to the industrial complex in Barrie. Of the 605 homes in the path of these tornadoes, approximately one-third were rendered uninhabitable. One of the more sobering instances was that of a blind Orangeville-area man whose home suffered a similar fate, following a painstaking 20 years of construction (LeGrand, 1990). Nevertheless, in the hours following the event, soldiers from "B" and "F" Companies, The Grey and Simcoe Foresters and from Canadian Forces Base in Borden assembled in Barrie to assist in the canvassing of the worst affected areas of the city. Coincidentally, the latter had barely escaped a tornado itself that day, it having momentarily touched down in the Blackdown Park Training Area before lifting again and passing over hundreds of married quarters. In addition, the Grand Valley library (levelled by an F4 tornado) donated books, and wooden pallets were donated by a local trucking company in Barrie so survivors could salvage their possessions.

Most of Grand Valley was completely rebuilt by August 1986, a little over a year later. The textile plant, Albarrie (one of twelve factories completely destroyed by the Barrie tornado) opened its doors once again within the next year. Even so, to this day there are still hints from the past of the tornadoes that day. Some of the wooded areas that were affected are still a twisted mess, and some random debris still remains scattered in the bush to the east of Highway 400 in Barrie. In the end, the price tag from the severe weather in Ontario alone reached an estimated $200 million (in unadjusted Canadian dollars, 1985). Correlating to nearly $390 million in Canadian dollars by today's standard, it was a very expensive disaster indeed (LeGrand, 1990). This tornado outbreak ranks among the Southern Ontario tornado outbreak of 2005 and the 1998 Ice Storm as one of the most costly weather disasters to strike Ontario. Climatologists have estimated that the probability of a severe weather outbreak as widespread and catastrophic as this one, occurring this far north and east in North America once again is one in 75,000 (Grazulis, 2001).

On the evening of May 31, 1985, an F1 tornado touched down far to the east of the other twisters from that day at around 8:10 p.m., near Grippen Lake, about 35 kilometres northeast of Kingston, Ontario. This makes it a "14th lost and found tornado".

See also 
List of North American tornadoes and tornado outbreaks
List of F5 and EF5 tornadoes
1953 Sarnia tornado outbreak
2018 United States–Canada tornado outbreak

References

Further reading 
Fuller, John G. (1987). "Tornado Watch #211"
Witten, Donald E. (1985). "May 31, 1985 - A Deadly Tornado Outbreak". Weatherwise magazine, 38 (4).
Bruineman, M. (May 30, 2010). Touchdown - 25 years after the Barrie Tornado. The Barrie Examiner, pp. A8-A9.
Grazulis, T. (1990). Significant Tornadoes: 1880-1989, Vol. 2. St. Johnsbury, VT: Environmental Films.
Grazulis, T. (2001). The Tornado: Nature's Ultimate Windstorm. Norman, OK: University of Oklahoma Press.
Grenci, L. and Nese, J. (1998). A World of Weather (2nd Ed). Dubuque, IA: Kendall-Hunt Publishing.
Joe, P. and Leduc, M. (1993). Radar Signatures and Severe Weather Forecasting. In D. Burgess, C. Church, R. Davies-Jones, and C. Doswell (Eds.), The Tornado: Its Structure, Dynamics, Prediction, and Hazards (pp. 233–240). Washington, DC: American Geophysical Union.
LeGrand, J. (1990). Chronicle of Canada. Montreal, QC: Chronicle Publications.
Verkaik, A. and J. (1997). Under the Whirlwind. Elmwood, ON: Whirlwind Books.
years later: What we’ve learned since the Barrie tornado., Global Toronto, May 31, 1985
'The sky was green': Barrie looks back on fatal tornado 30 years later, CTV Toronto, May 22, 2015
It’s been 31 years since deadly tornadoes hit central Ontario, CTV Barrie, May 31, 2016
Barrie tornado DVD brings tragic day to life, Barrie Examiner, May 31, 2016

External links

NWS Storm Data
Website on the May 31, 1985 tornado outbreak
18 Never Before Seen Photos From Barrie's F4 Tornado (May 31st, 1985) (May 31, 2021)
NWS Cleveland outbreak page
Map of the 1985 United States - Canadian outbreak (U.S. tornadoes only) Tornado History Project
NOAA tornado event map including Ontario tornadoes
Analysis of the Moshannon State Park tornado
May 31, 1985: Northeastern Tornadoes
Barrie Tornado CBC News Coverage (1985) - YouTube
Timeline of the devestating [sic] tornadoes that hit 30 years ago - CTV Barrie - 2015
1985 Barrie tornado - Facebook group page
1985 southern Ontario tornado track map - The Weather Network

F5 tornadoes
Tornadoes of 1985
Tornadoes in Ohio
Tornadoes in Pennsylvania
Tornadoes in New York (state)
Tornado
Tornadoes in Ontario
Tornado outbreaks
Tornado
May 1985 events in North America